Tahoka is a city in and the county seat of Lynn County, Texas, United States. The population was 2,673 at the 2010 census.

Geography

Tahoka is located at  (33.165804, –101.799315).

Climate

According to the Köppen climate classification system, Tahoka has a semiarid climate, BSk on climate maps.

Demographics

2020 census

As of the 2020 United States census, there were 2,375 people, 964 households, and 665 families residing in the city.

2000 census
As of the census of 2000, 2,910 people, 1,063 households, and 783 families resided in the city. The population density was 1,213.9 people per square mile (468.1/km). The 1,194 housing units  averaged 498.1 per square mile (192.1/km). The racial makeup of the city was 74.71% White, 5.46% African American, 1.37% Native American, 0.10% Asian, 16.36% from other races, and 1.99% from two or more races. Hispanics or Latinos of any race were 44.78% of the population.

Of 1,063 households, 39.6% had children under the age of 18 living with them, 54.5% were married couples living together, 15.6% had a female householder with no husband present, and 26.3% were not families. About 25.4% of all households were made up of individuals, and 14.7% had someone living alone who was 65 years of age or older. The average household size was 2.70 and the average family size was 3.22.

In the city, the population was distributed as 32.0% under the age of 18, 7.3% from 18 to 24, 26.0% from 25 to 44, 19.5% from 45 to 64, and 15.2% who were 65 years of age or older. The median age was 35 years. For every 100 females, there were 92.1 males. For every 100 females age 18 and over, there were 85.6 males.

The median income for a household in the city was $23,214, and for a family was $30,200. Males had a median income of $29,293 versus $20,346 for females. The per capita income for the city was $13,145. About 21.6% of families and 24.2% of the population were below the poverty line, including 25.7% of those under age 18 and 32.9% of those age 65 or over.

Tahoka is served by a weekly newspaper, nearby station KPET (AM), and the various Lubbock radio and TV stations. KAMZ (FM) and KMMX (FM) are licensed to Tahoka, but have offices and studios in Lubbock and originate few if any programs from Lynn County.

Education
The city of Tahoka is served by the Tahoka Independent School District.

Notable people

 James Gill (born 1934), artist
 Val Joe Walker (1930–2013), National Football League player with the Green Bay Packers and the San Francisco 49ers

References

External links

Cities in Lynn County, Texas
Cities in Texas
County seats in Texas